Alistair Reid Buchan (27 May 1926 – 25 May 2004) was a Scottish footballer who played as a wing half for Huntly, Arbroath and Rochdale.

Buchan died in Aberdeen on 25 May 2004, at the age of 77.

References

1926 births
2004 deaths
Huntly F.C. players
Arbroath F.C. players
Rochdale A.F.C. players
Footballers from Aberdeen
Scottish footballers
Association football midfielders